Nada Abbas (born 28 May 2000 in Giza) is an Egyptian professional squash player. As of September 2020, she was ranked number 22 in the world.

References

2000 births
Living people
Egyptian female squash players
Sportspeople from Giza
21st-century Egyptian women